Daniel James Gale (born 15 June 1989) is an English cricketer. Gale is a right-handed batsman who bowls slow left-arm orthodox. He was born in Tadworth, Surrey and educated at Glyn School in Epsom.

While studying for his degree at Durham University, Gale made his first-class debut for Durham UCCE against Derbyshire in 2008. He appeared in six further first-class matches for the university, the last of which against in 2010 against Durham, by which time the university was playing as Durham MCCU following a change of name in 2010. In his five first-class matches, he scored 59 runs at an average of 48.33, with a high score of 37. With the ball, he took 9 wickets at a bowling average of 48.33, with best figures of 4/94.

In 2008, he made a single List A appearance for the Marylebone Cricket Club against Bangladesh A. In this match, he scored an unbeaten single with the bat, while with the ball he bowled 9 wicket-less overs for the cost of 58 runs.

References

External links
Dan Gale at ESPNcricinfo
Dan Gale at CricketArchive

1989 births
Living people
People from Reigate and Banstead (district)
Alumni of Durham University
English cricketers
Durham MCCU cricketers
Marylebone Cricket Club cricketers